Kuchean (also known as Tocharian B or West Tocharian) was a Western member of Tocharian branch of Indo-European languages, extinct from ninth century. Once spoken in the Tarim Basin in Central Asia. Tocharian B shows an internal chronological development; three linguistic stages have been detected. The oldest stage is attested only in Kucha. There are also the middle ('classicalʼ), and the late stage.

Nomenclature
Acorrding to Peyrot, the self-designation for the language was kuśi 'Kuča'. In scholarly works, it is known as West Tocharian or Kuchean.

Overview
According to scholar Michael Peyrot, Tocharian B is dated between the 5th and 10th centuries AD, and was spread from Kuča to Yānqi and Turfan. Paul Widmer, following Tamai's and Adams's studies, situates Tocharian B roughly between 400 CE to 1200 CE, its oldest layer dating from ca. 400 to 600 CE, around "Kucha and environs".

Documentation 
According to J. H. W. Penney, Tocharian B is reported to be documented as Buddhist religious literature, and as secular material "pertaining to everyday life".

References

Bibliography

Studies
 
 
 Peyrot, Michaël. “Tocharian”. In: The Indo-European Language Family: A Phylogenetic Perspective. Edited by Thomas Olander. Cambridge: Cambridge University Press, 2022. pp. 83–101. .
 

Tocharian literature
 Lundysheva, Olga and Maue, Dieter. "An Old Uyghur text fragment related to the Tocharian B “History of Kuchean kings”". In: Religion and State in the Altaic World: Proceedings of the 62nd Annual Meeting of the Permanent International Altaistic Conference (PIAC), Friedensau, Germany, August 18–23, 2019. Edited by Oliver Corff, Berlin, Boston: De Gruyter, 2022, pp. 111-124. https://doi.org/10.1515/9783110730562-010

Further reading

 
 
 
 
 
 
 
 
 
 
 Pinault, Georges-Jean. "Surveying the Tocharian B Lexicon". In: Orientalistische Literaturzeitung, vol. 114, no. 2, 2019, pp. 91-97. https://doi-org.wikipedialibrary.idm.oclc.org/10.1515/olzg-2019-0030

External links
 A dictionary of Tocharian B by Douglas Q. Adams
 Tocharian B lemmas in Wiktionary

Extinct languages of Asia
 
Indo-European languages
Languages of China